"Halloween 4: The Revenge of Rod Skyhook" is the fifth  episode of the eighth season of the American sitcom Modern Family. It aired on October 26, 2016 on American Broadcasting Company (ABC). The episode  is directed by  Chris Koch   and written by Stephen Lloyd. The name of the episode is a parody of the 1988 slasher film Halloween 4: The Return of Michael Myers.

Plot
It’s Halloween and Luke (Nolan Gould) organizes a party. However, Claire (Julie Bowen) and  Phil (Ty Burrell) realize that no one is going to turn up. With the help of Phil, who body pops in a beaver costume, and Claire, who manages to convince people to leave another more popular party to go to Luke’s, the party proves to be a success.

Jay (Ed O'Neill) and Gloria (Sofía Vergara) dress themselves as Joseph and Mary, as Joe is supposed to be Jesus. Manny (Rico Rodriguez) has chosen a Dalton Trumbo costume, which no one recognizes to a party at Earl Chambers' house. Jay initially wants Manny to play a prank on Earl, but after an angry confrontation he decides to bury the hatchet and end the feud. Finally, Manny is dropped at Luke’s place and meets a girl wearing a Dorothy Parker costume who finally identifies his Trumbo outfit.

Mitchell (Jesse Tyler Ferguson), Cameron (Eric Stonestreet), and Lily (Aubrey Anderson-Emmons) pursue a boy who Cameron believes threw an egg at him. It turns out that the boy didn't throw it, it actually was Claire, in response to Mitchell who began a prank war against his older sister. However, Claire missed Mitchell and hit Cameron instead. Cameron is very happy however, that his husband stood up for him when confronted by the boy's father.

Reception 
Kyle Fowle of The A.V. Club gave the episode a B−.

References

External links
 
 "Halloween IV : Revenge of Rod Skyhook" at ABC.com

2016 American television episodes
Modern Family (season 8) episodes
Halloween television episodes